Staniša Mandić (born 27 January 1995) is a Montenegrin professional footballer who plays as a striker for Serbian club Metalac Gornji Milanovac. 

He used to represent Serbia at Under-19 and Under-20 level, but at full international level, Mandić represented Montenegro in 2015, making 4 appearances.

Club career
Mandić made his first team debut with Čukarički in a 1–0 home league win over Napredak Kruševac on 6 April 2014. He scored his first competitive goal for the club in a 1–4 away loss against Red Star Belgrade on 12 April 2014. That was his only goal in four league appearances in the 2013–14 season. Mandić also won the 2014–15 Serbian Cup, the first major trophy in the club's history. In a match against Ordabasy, played on 7 July 2016, Mandić noted 2 goals and an assist after 382 days without a goal.

In the summer of 2017, Mandić moved on a one-year loan to Sogndal. In June 2018 it had been announced Sogndal purchased the contract with Mandić. In the summer of 2018 Mandić moved permanently to Sogndal on a three-years contract.

On 20 February 2019, Mandić moved on a one-year loan to HŠK Zrinjski Mostar in the Premier League of Bosnia and Herzegovina. He made his debut for Zrinjski in a 0–1 home loss to FK Sarajevo in the 2018–19 Bosnian Cup. Mandić scored his first goal for Zrinjski in a 0–1 away win against FK Sarajevo in the 2018–19 Bosnian Premier League season.

International career
Mandić represented Serbia at the 2014 UEFA Under-19 Championship. He scored the winning goal in the 90th minute against Bulgaria, taking the team to the semi-finals of the tournament, as well as securing them a spot at the 2015 FIFA U-20 World Cup. After returning from the U20 World Cup in New Zealand, Serbia U21 coach Tomislav Sivić made his squad for the 2017 UEFA Euro U21 qualifiers, which did not include Mandić. Vladimir Matijašević, Čukarički's sports director, wrote a letter to Sivić which garnered national publicity when he suggested that Sivić was selecting players for the U21 team based on their agents and not their qualities as players.

On August 31, 2015, Mandić announced that he accepted an invitation from the Football Association of Montenegro to play for the Montenegrin national team. He made his senior debut for them in a September 2015 European Championship qualification match against Moldova and has earned a total of 4 caps, scoring no goals. His final international was a November 2015 friendly match against Macedonia.

Career statistics

Club

International

Honours
Čukarički 
 Serbian Cup: 2014–15
Mura
Slovenian Cup : 2019–20
Serbia 
 FIFA U-20 World Cup: 2015

References

External links
 
 

1995 births
Living people
People from Herceg Novi
Serbs of Montenegro
Association football forwards
Serbian footballers
Serbia youth international footballers
Montenegrin footballers
Montenegro international footballers
Montenegro under-21 international footballers
FK Čukarički players
Sogndal Fotball players
HŠK Zrinjski Mostar players
NŠ Mura players
FK Metalac Gornji Milanovac players
Serbian SuperLiga players
Eliteserien players
Norwegian First Division players
Premier League of Bosnia and Herzegovina players
Slovenian PrvaLiga players
Montenegrin expatriate footballers
Expatriate footballers in Norway
Montenegrin expatriate sportspeople in Norway
Expatriate footballers in Bosnia and Herzegovina
Montenegrin expatriate sportspeople in Bosnia and Herzegovina
Expatriate footballers in Slovenia
Montenegrin expatriate sportspeople in Slovenia